Casumer Bach is a river of North Rhine-Westphalia, Germany. It is approximately 7.2 km long and flows directly into the Hessel east of Versmold.

See also
List of rivers of North Rhine-Westphalia

Rivers of North Rhine-Westphalia
Rivers of Germany